The 1957 British West Indies Championships was the first edition of the track and field competition between British colony nations in the Caribbean. Held in Kingston, Jamaica, it was supported by retired Olympic sprint medallist Herb McKenley. A total of eighteen events were contested, all of them by men – women's events were not added until two years later.

Two athletes completed individual doubles: Jamaica's Ernle Haisley won the high jump and pole vault, while George de Peana of British Guiana had a long-distance running double. Also among the medallists was Lester Bird of Antigua who would later go on to be the Prime Minister of Antigua and Barbuda (succeeding his father, Vere Bird).

Medal summary

References

Medallists
British West Indies Championships. GBR Athletics. Retrieved on 2015-03-21.

British West Indies Championships
British West Indies Championships
British West Indies Championships
British West Indies Championships
International athletics competitions hosted by Jamaica
Sport in Kingston, Jamaica